Heather Deal is a Canadian biologist and politician. She served as a Vancouver city councillor until 2018, first elected as a member of Vision Vancouver in 2005. She previously served as a Vancouver Park Board commissioner for the 2002 to 2005 term as a member of Coalition of Progressive Electors.

Background

Deal was born in England and raised in Michigan and spent 6 years in Ohio doing her undergraduate degree in Biology at Oberlin College and working at Case Western University in Cleveland as a medical research technician. In 1984, she moved to Vancouver and became a Canadian citizen in 1991.
Deal got her M.Sc. in Microbiology/Immunology from UBC and worked in various medical research positions at UBC, VGH and the BC Cancer Agency. She then moved to jobs in education, training and research for UBC Continuing Studies, the BC Government’s Watershed Restoration Program and the David Suzuki Foundation.

In 1989 Deal joined the Vancouver Bach Choir, Vancouver’s premier symphonic choir, and became president of the board 2 years later. She recruited housing activist Jim Green to the Board of Directors and in 2001 the Choir performed a free concert of Handel’s Messiah in Blood Alley. She continues to sing in the choir today.
Citation

Vancouver Park Board

In 2002 Deal ran for office for the first time and came in first for the Vancouver Park Board. She served as Chair in her first year on the Board.

Vancouver City Council

By 2005 Deal had left COPE and joined the new electoral association, Vision Vancouver. She ran for City Council with the inaugural Vision Vancouver slate in 2005 and was elected to Council for her first of 4 terms (2005-2008, 2008-2011, 2011-2014, 2014-21018).

In her time on Vancouver City Council, Deal was a strong champion for the arts. This included introducing Vancouver’s first Creative City and Music strategies.
Deal made it her mission to liven Vancouver’s streets by supporting installations of public art and cultural attractions and festivals like the city’s 125th-anniversary Summer Live concerts. In 2008, Deal introduced an innovative food-cart program that has been credited with creating a food revolution.

Throughout her 16 year tenure as an elected official, Deal served on numerous boards and committees, and chaired several committees:

Vancouver City Councillor 2005-2018

Served as Deputy Mayor, fulfilling diplomacy and protocol responsibilities
Served as chair of committees and caucus
Served as Council liaison to Citizen Advisory Committees, including
Active Transportation, overseeing development/implementation of Transportation 2040
Arts and Culture, initiating Nightlife Council, Creative City and Music City Strategies
Public Art, launching $1.5 Public Art Boost and Mural Fest
Heritage Commission, driving and implementing new Heritage Action Plan
Food Policy, initiating Vancouver Food Strategy and Food Truck Program
Liaison to People with Disabilities Committee
Vancouver Public Library Trustee
Vancouver Art Gallery Board of Directors
Represented City on many files and Boards

Metro Vancouver Board and Committees

Chair, Regional Parks
Member of multiple Metro Vancouver committees, including
Intergovernmental and Finance
Solid Waste (Vice Chair)
Environment and Energy
Aboriginal Relations
Regional Culture
Electoral Area A
Lower Mainland Local Government Association (MV Representative)
Fraser Basin Council (MV Representative)
Chair, Climate Change Committee
Chair, Water and Watersheds Committee
Member, Flood Mitigation Leadership Committee

Federation of Canadian Municipalities

Board member, advocating to Federal Government for Local Government priorities
Chair, Environmental Issues and Sustainable Development
Member of committees and working groups, including
Social-Economic Development
Women’s Participation in Municipal Government
Community Safety and Crime Prevention
Municipal Infrastructure and Transportation
Urban Indigenous Working Group
Rail Safety Working Group

Civic Life
Since leaving City Hall in 2018, Deal has continued to be actively involved in civic life. In 2019, Deal was appointed to the new Granville Island Council with authority and responsibility for governance of Granville Island, and was elected Chair by the Council. She was re-elected chair in 2020.

References

https://www.globenewswire.com/news-release/2020/10/08/2105860/0/en/Granville-Island-welcomes-Tom-Lancaster-as-new-General-Manager.html

https://theprovince.com/opinion/columnists/fred-lees-social-network-rincon-fit-for-a-crown-yule-duel-makes-gastown-merry-lunch-bunch-brightens-crabtree-corner

https://aibc.ca/2019/08/heather-deal-named-new-lieutenant-governor-appointee-to-aibc-council/

https://www.nsnews.com/local-news/grouse-mountain-officially-becomes-a-park-3056093

https://www.mapleridgenews.com/news/metro-vancouver-adds-to-maple-ridges-kanaka-park/#

https://www.cbc.ca/news/canada/british-columbia/surrey-bend-regional-park-opens-1.3539662

https://www.cbc.ca/news/canada/british-columbia/creative-city-music-strategy-1.4591402

https://www.cbc.ca/news/canada/british-columbia/vancouver-councillor-seeks-ban-on-pet-store-sales-of-dogs-cats-and-rabbits-1.4172841

https://www.globenewswire.com/news-release/2020/10/08/2105860/0/en/Granville-Island-welcomes-Tom-Lancaster-as-new-General-Manager.html

https://www.cbc.ca/news/canada/british-columbia/vision-vancouver-candidates-city-council-park-board-1.4738767

https://www.vancouverisawesome.com/courier-archive/news/live-alone-tips-on-how-to-manage-during-covid-19-pandemic-3119388

https://www.cbc.ca/news/canada/british-columbia/false-creek-towers-vancouver-council-july-2018-1.4759703

https://globalnews.ca/news/4579495/vision-vancouver-wiped-out/

https://dailyhive.com/vancouver/granville-island-council-cmhc-vancouver

https://www.cbc.ca/news/canada/british-columbia/douglas-coupland-vancouver-golden-tree-1.3710622

https://www.cbc.ca/news/canada/british-columbia/creative-city-music-strategy-1.4591402

https://cyclingmagazine.ca/sections/news/vancouvers-proposed-bike-lanes-officially-approved/
https://globalnews.ca/news/3913598/vancouver-budget-property-tax-hike/

https://www.bcbusiness.ca/heather-deal-vancouver-city-councillor

https://www.cbc.ca/news/canada/british-columbia/creative-city-music-strategy-1.4591402

External links
 Profile on City of Vancouver website

Vision Vancouver councillors
Living people
Canadian biologists
Scientists from Vancouver
Women municipal councillors in Canada
Women in British Columbia politics
English emigrants to Canada
Oberlin College alumni
University of British Columbia alumni
Year of birth missing (living people)